Zouérat is the largest town in northern Mauritania and the capital of Tiris Zemmour region, with an approximate population of 44,649 (2013).  It lies at the eastern end of the Mauritania Railway to Nouadhibou.

History 

The town developed from its importance to iron ore mining. It is surrounded by the hematite mines of Fderîck, Tazadit and Rouessa. The town houses the regional administration and military for Tiris Zemmour. Most of the town's population are employed directly and indirectly in the mining industry. A sizeable number of foreign workers from other African countries live in the town.  Amenities include a medical clinic, social club, pool, school and shop.

Since 2006, a shanty town has grown around the town. In response authorities have begun construction of a wall, nicknamed locally as the "mur de la honte" (wall of shame), to separate the two areas.

Mining
Mining at the mountain was first recorded from the Kediet ej Jill in the 11th century, but it was not until 1952 that iron ore deposits were first commercially extracted on an industrial scale. Beginning in 1958, the first concessions on iron ore extraction were given to Miferma, Société des mines de fer de Mauritanie. At the time it was majority-controlled by European-based mining interests, however, in 1974 Miferma was nationalized by the Mauritanian government.

Other companies exploring for iron ore in the region include Xstrata and Arcelor Mittal. The reserves at the SNIM's Tazadit mine are estimated to be 200 million tonnes of hematite.

Transport

Zouérat is connected to the port of Nouadhibou by the Mauritania Railway. The line is also used to bring in all the town's drinking water from Boulenoir.

Tazadit Airport is served by regular flights from/to Nouadhibou and seasonally from/to Casablanca using Mauritania Airlines International Boeing 737-500 and Boeing 737-700 planes.

Outside the mines, traffic drives on the right side of the road like the rest of Mauritania. However, all vehicles within the mining areas drive on the left. Traffic switches sides at the mine entrances.

Climate
Zouérat has a hot desert climate (Köppen climate classification BWh). The climate is hot and dry throughout the year, a description accredited to the town's location within the extremes of the Sahara.

See also 

 Railway stations in Mauritania

References 

Tiris Zemmour Region
Regional capitals in Mauritania
Communes of Mauritania
Railway stations in Mauritania